Old Higgins Farm Windmill is a historic Smock windmill off of Old King's Highway at Drummer Boy Park in Brewster on Cape Cod in Massachusetts.

The windmill was built in 1795, it last ground grain around 1900.   The windmill was moved a number of times the last from Ellis Landing in Brewster to its current location in 1974. In 1975 it was added to the National Historic Register of Historic Places.

The windmill was donated its then owner, Mrs. Samuel Nickerson, in memory of her husband, to the Brewster Historical Society which continues to maintain it at its current location.

Gallery

See also
National Register of Historic Places listings in Barnstable County, Massachusetts

References

External links

Brewster Historical Society
Town of Brewester

1975 establishments in Massachusetts
Brewster, Massachusetts
Buildings and structures in Barnstable County, Massachusetts
Grinding mills in Massachusetts
Grinding mills on the National Register of Historic Places in Massachusetts
Industrial buildings completed in 1795
National Register of Historic Places in Barnstable County, Massachusetts
Octagonal buildings in the United States
Smock mills in the United States
Tourist attractions in Barnstable County, Massachusetts
Windmills completed in 1795
Windmills in Massachusetts
Windmills on the National Register of Historic Places